Melissa Perry is an Australian judge. 

Melissa Perry may also refer to:

 Melissa Perry (epidemiologist), American researcher
 Melissa Harris-Perry, American writer
 Melissa Harris-Perry (TV program), her TV show